Peter King (born 24 May 1959) is an Australian former cricketer. He played seven first-class cricket matches for Victoria between 1982 and 1985.

See also
 List of Victoria first-class cricketers

References

External links
 

1959 births
Living people
Australian cricketers
Victoria cricketers
Cricketers from Melbourne